Rodoald (or Rodwald), ( 630 – 653) was a Lombard king of Italy, who succeeded his father Rothari on the throne in 652. He was said to be lecherous and he was assassinated after a reign of just six months in 653 by the husband of one of his lovers. Paul the Deacon writes that Rodoald "had reigned five years and seven days,
" (more probably five months and seven days), although historians note that this length of reign is suspect. Aripert, a rival claimant, was elected with the support of the Catholic Church, which opposed the Arian monarchy.

Notes

External links
 Paul the Deacon, History of the Lombards, Book 4, translated by William Dudley Foulke, 1907. See chapter XLVIII for Rodoald’s reign.

630s births

653 deaths
Year of birth uncertain
7th-century Lombard monarchs

7th-century murdered monarchs
Harodingian dynasty